Merkur Spielarena (stylized as MERKUR SPIEL-ARENA), previously known as the Esprit Arena (until 2 August 2018), the LTU Arena (until June 2009), and as the Düsseldorf Arena (during the 2011 Eurovision Song Contest), is a multi-functional football stadium in Düsseldorf, Germany. The stadium holds 54,600 and has a retractable roof. Its special heating system allows the stadium to host comfortable events at the height of winter.

History 

Construction of the stadium began in 2002 and was completed in 2004. It was built to replace the former Rheinstadion at the same site near the river Rhine. The structure's initial seating capacity of 51,500 was expanded in summer 2010 when some seating areas were converted into standing terraces. The arena currently hosts association football team Fortuna Düsseldorf.

Sports events

International football matches
While the Arena was not one of the venues for the 2006 FIFA World Cup in Germany, it has hosted several international matches since it opened.

The first international match in the Arena was an international friendly between Germany and Argentina on 9 February 2005, ending in a 2–2 draw. On 7 February 2007, Germany played their second international friendly in the Arena, beating Switzerland 3–1. In their third international friendly in the Arena, on 11 February 2009, Germany suffered a 1–0 defeat to Norway.

The Arena also hosted two international friendlies of the Portugal national football team. In Portugal's first international friendly in the Arena, on 1 March 2006, they recorded a 3–0 win over Saudi Arabia. On 26 March 2008, Portugal played their second international friendly in the Arena, suffering a 2–1 defeat to Greece national football team. In September 2022 it will host a friendly between USMNT & Japan.

Other sports events
The stadium was the former home of the Rhein Fire of NFL Europe, an American football league. They were tenants for their final three seasons from 2005 to 2007. The stadium hosted World Bowl XIII and XIV. Esprit Arena hosted the Race of Champions 2010, with notable drivers such as Michael Schumacher, Sebastian Vettel, Alain Prost and Sébastien Loeb.

The Esprit Arena was the host venue for boxing world heavyweight championship bouts: between Wladimir Klitschko and Eddie Chambers on 20 March 2010 (Klitschko won the bout by KO in the 12th round), Wladimir Klitschko against Jean-Marc Mormeck on 3 March 2012 (Klitschko won by KO in the 4th round), Wladimir Klitschko against Tyson Fury on 28 November 2015 (see Wladimir Klitschko vs. Tyson Fury (Fury won by a unanimous points decision).

In 2021, the stadium hosted the Championship Game auf the inaugural season of the European League of Football.

The arena will also host the opening and closing ceremonies of 2025 Summer World University Games and is schedule to host the basketball,3x3 basketball and volleyball events.

Music events
German Singer Herbert Grönemeyer opened the arena with two concerts on 7 and 8 January 2005 as conclusion of his Mensch-Tour. On 8 June 2011, he returned with his Schiffsverkehr Tour.

The German rock band Die Toten Hosen, which is based in Düsseldorf, gave a total of seven concerts in the arena. The first one on 10 September 2005 as last concert of their Friss Oder Stirb Tour. They returned to the homeground of their favourite football team for two more concerts on 11 and 12 October 2013 as final of their Krach der Republik Tour. The next two concerts were on 12 and 13 October 2018 as part of their Laune der Natour. The two most recent concerts were on 24 and 25 June 2022 as part of their 40 years Anniversary Tour.

Phil Collins played the arena four times: First as a solo artist during his First Final Farewell Tour on 12 and 13 November 2005 and then again with his band Genesis during their Turn It On Again Tour on 26 and 27 June 2007 in a sold-out crowd of 88,397 fans in attendance.

Another German singer Marius Müller-Westernhagen played a concert at the arena on 2 December 2005.

British Rock band The Rolling Stones played the arena three times: First on 12 August 2007 during the Bigger Bang Tour, then again on 19 June 2014 as part of the 14 On Fire Tour and on 9 October 2017 during the No Filter Tour.

Bon Jovi performed at the stadium on 13 May 2006 during their Have A Nice Day Tour, in front of a sold-out crowd of 47,862 people. The band performed at the stadium for the second time on 13 July 2011 during their Live 2011, in front of a sold-out crowd of 43,625 people.

On 16 June 2008, Bruce Springsteen and the E Street Band performed at the arena as part of the Magic Tour for more than 33,000 people. They are scheduled to return on 21 June 2023 for a concert as part of the 2023 Tour.

Coldplay played the arena on 27 August 2009 as part of their Viva La Vida Tour.

On New Year's Eve 2008, the dance music event Sensation was held with an attendance of over 15,000.

Depeche Mode performed at the stadium six times: the first and the second were on 20 and 21 January 2006 during their Touring the Angel. The third and the fourth were on 26 and 27 February 2010 during their Tour of the Universe, in front of a total crowd of 90,693 people. The fifth and the sixth were on 3 and 5 July 2013 during their Delta Machine Tour, in front of a total sold-out crowd of 87,308 people. The 2010 shows were recorded for the group's live albums project Recording the Universe.

The arena has played host to music festivals, including Projekt Revolution.

Esprit Arena hosted the 56th Eurovision Song Contest in 2011.

Madonna played two concerts in 2006 and 2008 during her Confessions Tour and Sticky & Sweet Tour, respectively, at the venue.

The Black Eyed Peas brought their The Beginning Tour to the arena on 28 June 2011.

On 25 July 2011, British pop band Take That performed in the arena with opening act Pet Shop Boys.

On 18 June 2011 and 6 September 2013, Roger Waters performed The Wall live at the arena.

On 7 June 2014, German Singer Udo Lindenberg performed a concert.

One Direction (with opening act by 5 Seconds of Summer) performed on 2 July 2014 a sold-out concert for a crowd of 44,684 people as part of their Where We Are Tour.

On 5 September 2015, the festival Rock im Sektor took place at the arena with concerts by Linkin Park, Broiler, Kraftklub and others.

Paul McCartney performed on 28 May 2016 during his worldwide One On One tour.

On 15 June 2016, Australian rock band AC/DC performed the last European concert of their Rock Or Bust Tour at the arena.

On 12 July 2016, Beyoncé performed at the stadium as part of her The Formation World Tour.

On 18 and 19 June 2022, Rammstein performed two concerts as part of their Europe Stadium Tour 2022 with an audience of 45,000 per concert.

On 17 July 2022, Lady Gaga kicked off The Chromatica Ball at the stadium with the audience of over 45,000.

On 4 July 2023, The Weeknd will perform at the stadium as part of his After Hours til Dawn Tour.

Naming rights
The naming rights to the stadium are currently held by gambling company Gauselmann.

From July 2009 to August 2018, the clothing manufacturer Esprit held the naming rights. Prior to July 2009, the German airline LTU held the naming rights.

Düsseldorf's mayor Dirk Elbers stated that, due to treaty obligations, the arena would lose its sponsor name and be renamed Düsseldorf Arena for the period of the Eurovision Song Contest 2011 which was held there in May 2011.

Public transport

 is a terminus station of the Düsseldorf urban rail line 78, part of the Verkehrsverbund Rhein-Ruhr (VRR).

References

External links

 

Fortuna Düsseldorf
Football venues in Germany
Retractable-roof stadiums in Europe
American football venues in Germany
Buildings and structures in Düsseldorf
Sport in Düsseldorf
Convention centres in Germany
Sports venues in North Rhine-Westphalia
Sports venues completed in 2004
2004 establishments in Germany
UEFA Euro 2024 stadiums